Archant Limited is a newspaper and magazine publishing company headquartered in Norwich, England. The group publishes four daily newspapers, around 50 weekly newspapers, and 80 consumer and contract magazines.

Archant employs around 1,250 employees, mainly in East Anglia, the Home counties and the West Country, and was known as Eastern Counties Newspapers Group until March 2002.

History

1845 to 1900
The company began publishing in Norwich in 1845 with Norfolk News, backed by Jacob Henry Tillet, Jeremiah Colman, John and Johnathan Copeman. The Colman and Copeman families still retain close involvement in the business.

The Eastern Weekly Press was launched in 1867 and in 1870 was renamed the Eastern Daily Press. A sister title, the Eastern Evening News, was launched in 1882.

1900 to 2000
As the business grew it moved premises in 1902, 1959 and again in the late 1960s to its present headquarters location at Prospect House in the centre of Norwich.

At the end of the 1960s, Eastern Counties Newspapers merged with the East Anglian Daily Times Company, publisher of the East Anglian Daily Times, to form Eastern Counties Newspapers Group (ECNG).

ECNG developed further with the launch of Community Media Limited in 1981, a weeklies publishing operation based in Bath, which launched and acquired titles in Scotland and the West Country.

In 1985, ECNG purchased the East Anglia-based Advertiser group of weekly free newspapers. These businesses operated as separate entities until the mid-1990s when they were brought together under the ECNG banner.

ECNG acquired four weekly newspapers in Huntingdon, Ely, Wisbech and March from Thomson in 1993. The acquisition of Peterhead-based P Scrogie followed shortly afterwards.

In 1995 the company opened a new 25m Print Center in Thorpe, Norwich, with Goss HT70 Presses and Muller-Martini Mailroom Equipment, Replacing the Goss Metro Presses at Prospect House.

The company moved into Internet publishing in 1996 when it launched Eastern Counties Network, a Web-based service using copy from its four daily newspapers as well as original material. Later this was disaggregated into separate websites for each of the newspapers.

In April 1998, ECNG bought Home Counties Newspapers Holdings plc with an agreed bid of approximately £58 million. The bid earned the company the nickname of "The News Corp. of East Anglia". HCNH published a range of 26 weekly paid and free titles across Greater London and the Home Counties. The title portfolio included the Hampstead & Highgate Express, the South Essex Recorder series, the Herts Advertiser series, the Comet series, the Herald group and the Welwyn & Hatfield Times.

Consumer magazine publisher Market Link Publishing, now Archant Specialist, based in Essex was acquired by ECNG for £5 million in autumn 1999. Its titles now include Photography Monthly, Professional Photographer, Pilot, Sport Diver, Complete France, which sponsors a once popular, but failing French forum, French Property News, Living France, and France Property Shop. It also sponsors The France Show at Olympia and The French Property Exhibitions in London and Yorkshire.

2000 to present

The launch of a county magazine in Norfolk in 2000 saw the beginning of what is now Archant Life, the country's biggest publisher of county magazines. The division was subsequently scaled through multiple acquisitions in the North West, the Cotswolds and the South and South East of England.

In March 2002, ECNG changed its name to Archant, prompted by the company's broadening geographic scope and growing range of its activities.

In December 2003, Archant purchased 27 weekly newspapers from Independent News & Media in two separate deals worth up to £62 million. The titles included the Hackney Gazette, Islington Gazette, the East London Advertiser, the Barking & Dagenham Post, the Bexley Times and the Bromley Times.

In April 2007, Archant Scotland's eight newspaper titles were sold to Johnston Press for around £11 million.

In February 2008, Archant acquired Compass Magazines and its four monthly regional magazines in Dorset, Hampshire and Surrey.

In September 2009, Archant Print completed an £8 million project to bring its press centre in Norwich up to ten printing towers with associated equipment.

In November 2009, Archant launched Great British Life, a website portal. In the same month, Archant launched Subscription Save, a dedicated magazine subscriptions portal for their publications.

In May 2010, Archant launched Cambridge First, a weekly newspaper in Cambridge.

In June 2010, Archant acquired KOS Media Publishing Ltd, the publisher of Kent on Sunday and a series of free weekly newspapers, magazines, websites and mobile products, for an undisclosed sum.

In February 2011, Archant London launched an all-new news & information website for London – London24.

In May 2011, Archant Life acquired the Wye Valley Life and Life in The Marches titles from Wye Valley Media Ltd.

In November 2011, Archant completed a change to its legal structure to simplify the trading companies into one single legal entity, now called Archant Community Media Limited. This does not change the name of the group which remains as Archant Ltd.

In January 2012, Archant launched the unique iwitness24 community news platform that aims to transform the way it gathers news. It is designed to allow readers to contribute pictures and videos in a quick and easy way.

In January 2013, saw a move into local TV with the launch of Mustard TV online in Norwich.

In August 2013, Archant announced the completion of the acquisition of www.planningfinder.com.

In July 2016 Archant announced a new weekly 'pop-up newspaper', The New European, designed in response to the UK's vote to leave the European Union. With a cover price of £2, it was initially intended to run for four editions only; 

In August 2017 Mustard TV closed, having been sold to the That's TV Group.

In December 2017, Archant won a €676,000.00 grant from Google's Digital News Initiative. The project, Local Recall, aims to bring 150 years of newspapers back to life through the latest technology; chatbots. Archant, in partnership with local artificial intelligence leaders ubisend, take on this two-year challenge to make their archived newspapers available via voice and text chatbots.

In September 2019 Archant announced its intention to out-source all newspaper printing to Newsprinters (Broxbourne) Ltd. from 10 November 2019, and close the Archant Print Center in Thorpe St. Andrew's Norwich, bringing to an end 174 years of newspaper printing in the city.   In a letter to staff, Archant said the decision had been taken due to "changes" in the newspaper industry and the move will provide "substantial cost savings". Approximately 95 Norwich Jobs will be lost as a direct result of this change.

In January 2020 Archant sold its headquarters, Prospect House, to regional insurance firm Alan Boswell Group.

In July 2020, Archant announced it had put itself up for sale and was willing to plug a funding deficit exacerbated by the COVID-19 pandemic's disastrous impact on industry-wide advertising revenues. On August 30, it was announced that the operational units of Archant had been sold to private equity firm Rcapital Partners, (and the pension funds transferred to UK Government Pension Protection Fund); the holding companies were put into administration, making the existing shares worthless.

In March 2022, Rcapital sold the group to American media giant Newsquest.

Publications

Magazines 
Online and print magazines include:
 Airgun World
 Archant Life county magazines:
 Hampshire Life
 Kent Life
 Somerset Life
 Sussex Life
 Essex Life
Norfolk Magazine
Suffolk Magazine
Cheshire Life
Cornwall Life
Cotswold Life
Derbyshire Life
Devon Life
Dorset Magazine
East Suffolk Living
Exeter & East Devon Life
Hertfordshire Life
Lancashire Life
Life in North Wales
Surrey Life
West Essex Life
Yorkshire Life

Daily newspapers
 East Anglian Daily Times
 Eastern Daily Press (EDP)
 Norwich Evening News
 Ipswich Star

Weekly paid newspapers
Many of the paid for titles have free online edition (web pages, some also have a digital facsimile of the print edition including advertisements)
 Barking & Dagenham Post – Barking and Dagenham, London
 Beccles and Bungay Journal – Beccles and Bungay
 Brent & Kilburn Times – Brent and Kilburn, London
 Cambs Times – Cambridgeshire
 Dereham & Fakenham Times – Dereham and Fakenham
 Docklands and East London Advertiser— East London
 Ely Standard – Ely
 Exmouth Journal – Exmouth
 Great Yarmouth Mercury – Great Yarmouth
 Green Un – an Ipswich-based Association football weekly
 Hackney Gazette – Hackney, London
 Hampstead & Highgate Express (Ham & High) – Hampstead and Highgate, London (Paid with limited free distribution)
 Ilford Recorder – Ilford
 Islington Gazette – Islington, London
 Lowestoft Journal – Lowestoft
 Newham Recorder – Newham, London
 North Norfolk News – North Norfolk
 The Pink'un – a Norwich-based Association football weekly (digital only)
 Romford Recorder – Romford
 Royston Crow – Royston
 Sidmouth Herald – Sidmouth
 Welwyn Hatfield Times – Welwyn Garden City, Hatfield and Potters Bar
 The Weston & Somerset Mercury – Weston-super-Mare and Somerset
 Wood & Vale – St John's Wood, Marylebone and Maida Vale, London (Paid with limited free distribution)

Weekly free newspapers
 Diss Mercury— Diss
 Dunmow Broadcast & Recorder – Great Dunmow
 Exmouth Herald – Exmouth
 The Advertiser – Coastal edition (East Suffolk)
 The Advertiser – Great Yarmouth edition
 The Advertiser – Ipswich edition
 The Advertiser – North Norfolk edition
 The Advertiser – South Norfolk edition
 The Advertiser – Waveney edition
 Comet Series – North Hertfordshire
 Havering Post – Havering, London
 Herts Advertiser Series – St Albans & Harpenden
 The Hunts Post –  Huntingdonshire
 Midweek Herald – East Devon
 North Devon Gazette & Advertiser – North Devon
 North Somerset Times – North Somerset
 Norwich Extra – Delivered every three weeks from 11 November 2019; a decision "driven by our publishing strategy to serve or local communities as effectively as possible while also maximizing the response for advertising clients" 
 Property Extra
 Saffron Walden Reporter – Saffron Walden
 Sidmouth Herald – Sidmouth
 Watton Times – Thetford & Watton, Norfolk
 West Suffolk Mercury Series – West Suffolk
 Weston-super-Mare Admag – Weston-super-Mare
 Wisbech Standard – Wisbech
 Wymondham & Attleborough Mercury – Wymondham & Attleborough

Former newspapers
 Herts Herald – East Hertfordshire
 Kent on Sunday – Kent, Southeast London
 yourashford – Ashford, Kent
 yourcanterbury – Canterbury
 yourdeal – Deal, Kent
 yourdover – Dover
 yourmaidstone – Maidstone
 yourmedway – Medway
 yoursandwich – Sandwich, Kent
 yourshepway – Folkestone and Hythe
 yourswale – Swale
 yourthanet – Thanet
 The New European - national

References

External links
Official website

 
Mass media companies established in 1845
Publishing companies established in 1845
1845 establishments in the United Kingdom
Newspaper companies of England
Newspaper companies of the United Kingdom
Companies based in Norwich
Publishing companies of England